The 22nd Marine Expeditionary Unit (22nd MEU) is one of seven such units currently in existence in the United States Marine Corps. It is a Marine Air Ground Task Force with a strength of about 2,200 personnel. They are currently based out of Marine Corps Base Camp Lejeune, North Carolina and fall under the command of the II Marine Expeditionary Force. It is the most decorated of the U.S. Marine Corps' seven MEUs.

Mission
"Provide the United States with a forward-deployed, amphibious force-in-readiness capable of executing mission across the full spectrum of combat and military operations other than war."

Structure

The MEU consists of four basic elements:

Command Element (CE): Serves as the headquarters for the entire unit and allows a single command to exercise control over all ground, aviation and combat service support forces.

Ground Combat Element (GCE): Built around a Marine infantry battalion, the GCE is reinforced with tanks, artillery, amphibious vehicles, engineers and reconnaissance assets.

Aviation Combat Element (ACE): Consists of a composite medium tiltrotor (MV-22B Osprey) squadron containing transport aviation assets of various models and capabilities, attack helicopters and jets, air defense teams and all necessary ground support assets.

Logistics Combat Element (LCE): Provides the MEU with mission-essential support such as medical/dental assistance, motor transport, supply, equipment maintenance and landing is the mission of the LCE.

Current subordinate units
 Command Element: MEU commander and his supporting staff, provides command and control over the other three elements when composited.
 Ground Combat Element: 2nd Battalion, 6th Marines (2/6)
 Aviation Combat Element: Marine Medium Tiltrotor Squadron 263 (VMM-263)
 Logistics Combat Element: Combat Logistics Battalion 26 (CLB-26).

History

1980s
Activated on 1 December 1982 as the 22nd Marine Amphibious Unit (MAU), the 22nd Marine Expeditionary Unit (MEU) has had an impressive operational history and continues to serve as an expeditionary force in readiness.

The MEU's activation was the redesignation of the 32nd MAU, a unit that regularly deployed to the Mediterranean and Caribbean regions for more than 20 years.  On its final deployment, the MAU evacuated the Palestine Liberation Organization from Beirut, and was the first American unit to serve in the multi-national peace-keeping force in Lebanon.

On 22nd MAU's maiden deployment, it again visited Beirut where the Marines and Sailors served until May 1983, were present during the April 1983 United States embassy bombing, and began preparing for a third deployment to Lebanon upon return to the United States. On 18 October 1983, the MAU departed the United States, and less than two days into its trans-Atlantic voyage it was diverted to the southern Caribbean.

On 25 October 1983, the MAU participated in Operation Urgent Fury, the invasion of the island of Grenada, which was at that time, the largest U.S. military operation since the Vietnam War. The 22nd MAU conducted numerous helicopter and surface landings over three days and occupied 75 percent of the island; though the Marines constituted less than 20 percent of the total invasion force.

By 2 November of that same year, the unit transited to Beirut where it landed later that month.  The MAU remained ashore until late February 1984, when the mission drew to a close, and evacuated hundreds of American citizens from the country.

Throughout the rest of the 1980s, the 22nd MAU deployed on a rotation basis with the 24th and 26th MAUs, participating in numerous contingency operations and exercises.

In 1986, the 22nd MAU was the third unit to deploy with the 'Special Operations-Capable' designation.

On 5 February 1988, the word 'Amphibious' was replaced with 'Expeditionary' to reflect the Marine Corps' changing role in national defense and theater security.

1990s
In late 1990 the 22nd MEU disbanded down to the command element during the Gulf war and reformed the summer of 1991.  Saipan, Nashville, and the Harlan County were the ships they were on.

In September 1991, the deployment the MEU participated in the first combined arms exercise in Kuwait following Operations Desert Shield and Operation Desert Storm.  This deployment returned in March 1992.

Conflict in the Balkans kept the MEU busy during subsequent deployments as the unit participated in operations Operation Provide Promise, Operation Deny Flight and Operation Sharp Guard.  In 1993, the MEU also served during the United Nations’ mission to Somalia.

In April 1996, the 22nd MEU (SOC) arrived off the coast of civil war torn Liberia in western Africa for Operation Assured Response.  The unit remained at sea until 2 Aug. which the Marines went ashore to reinforce the U.S. Embassy in Monrovia and evacuated U.S. citizens and designated third-country nationals.  The MEU (SOC) evacuated more than 1,600 civilians over the course of the next several weeks, until the 26th MEU arrived to provide relief.

The MEU's deployments in 1996 and 1997 focused on West Africa as it answered the call to conduct reinforcement and evacuation missions in Liberia, Zaire, the Central African Republic, the Republic of Congo and Sierra Leone.  Additionally, the MEU continued to support Balkans peace-enforcement operations and conducted a non-combatant evacuation operation (NEO) in Albania.

In 1998, the 22nd MEU served in Bosnia and Kosovo, and was prepared to support operations in both Albania and Africa.

Global War on Terror

The MEU deployed during the turn of the millennium when it served as a [Y2K] contingency force, and also returned to the Balkans.  The MEU later returned to Kosovo in 2001.

During the MEU's 2002 deployment, the 22nd MEU took part in several anti-terrorist missions in the Central Command theater, including Afghanistan, Pakistan, and also launched life-saving humanitarian efforts in Djibouti.

In 2004, they again deployed to Afghanistan where the unit inserted deep in Afghanistan's remote Oruzgan Province where it established Forward Operating Base Ripley.  For four months, the MEU carried out an aggressive campaign against Taliban and anti-coalition factions in the area where senior Army officials considered it the most successful campaign in the history of Operation Enduring Freedom.

The 2005-2006 deployment saw the members of the 22nd MEU in Iraq, battling insurgents from a forward operating base in and around the ancient city of Hīt (pronounced "heet").  Battalion Landing Team, 1st Battalion, 2nd Marines, took the fight to the enemy, MSSG-22 worked to fix roads and other critical infrastructure in the area.  Over the course of its time in Iraq, the MEU participated in 14 named operations and uncovered vast quantities of insurgent arms, ammunition and ordnance.

While Battalion Landing Team, 1st Battalion, 2nd Marines, conducted combat operations against insurgents, MEU Service Support Group-22, now Combat Logistics Battalion 22, worked to provide a better environment and fix roads and other critical infrastructure for Iraqi citizens in the area. During this time, the MEU participated in 14 named operations and uncovered vast quantities of insurgent arms, ammunition and ordnance.

The MEU's 2007 and 2008 deployment brought the unit to the Bay of Bengal where its members conducted humanitarian relief operations after Tropical Cyclone Sidr struck eastern India and Bangladesh.  The MEU also supported counter piracy operations off the east coast of Africa and stood ready to support contingency operations in the Persian Gulf.  Before departing the area, the 22nd MEU supported President George W. Bush's visit to Israel and provided aviation lift for the President's support personnel.

From 25 September – 11 October 2007, AV-8B Harrier II's from the MEU flew 70 combat missions over Afghanistan providing aerial reconnaissance, close air support and convoy escort in support of Operation Enduring Freedom. Following the impact of Cyclone Sidr on 15 November 2007, the 22nd MEU, on board  moved off the coast of Bangladesh in the Bay of Bengal and provided humanitarian assistance to those affected by the cyclone.

The 22nd MEU deployed from May - December 2009.  The MEU was composed of Marines from the 3rd Battalion, 2nd Marines and from the Combat Logistics Battalion 22, as well as MV-22 Osprey aircraft from VMM-263.
 The MEU conducted numerous Theater Security Cooperation events in Europe and the Middle East during a deployment to the U.S. European Command and Central Command.  In Europe, the Marines trained in Bulgaria and Greece.

The 22nd MEU also made history in May 2009 when it was the first MEU to deploy with the MV-22 Osprey aircraft tilt-rotor aircraft.  During workups, the MEU experimented with different employment techniques to understand and utilize the full capability of the aircraft.

The MEU conducted four separate Theater Security Cooperation events with Middle Eastern partners to build positive relationships between militaries and strengthened regional security.  Near the end of the deployment, the MEU directly supported Operation Enduring Freedom by transferring the MV-22B Osprey tilt-rotor aircraft to forces on the ground, marking the first time the aircraft would support operations in Afghanistan.

After nearly nine eventful months at sea in the U.S. 5th and 6th Fleet areas of responsibility, the 22nd MEU participated in Operation Inherent Resolve as a theater reserve and crisis response force. Marines and Sailors of the 22nd MEU with the Bataan Amphibious Ready Group (BATARG) wrapped up their deployment and returned home in October 2014.

The MEU Command Element began the unit's pre-deployment training program in December 2015 and returned from another deployment cycle December 2016.

On 1 August 2016, AV-8B Harrier II assigned to the 22nd MEU flying off USS Wasp in the Mediterranean to carryout airstrikes on ISIS terrorists in Libya, amidst the Libyan Civil War, specifically to support local forces fighting ISIS in Sirte as part of a broader campaign against ISIS in the country.

2010 Haiti Earthquake

After the devastating, 12 January 2010 Haiti earthquake, Marines with the 22nd MEU embarked on the Bataan Amphibious ready group for Haiti in order to conduct a humanitarian assistance and disaster relief mission known as Operation Unified Response. 22nd MEU departed Camp Lejuene on 15 January and began arriving on 18 January.

Initially, the MEU conducted immediate relief operations by distributing food, water and providing medical care.

On 24 March, the MEU and ARG were released from their mission and sailed for home.

From February to March, the MEU transitioned to sustained relief operations and focused on turning over responsibilities to the Government of Haiti and major relief organizations ashore before departing at the end of March.

While supporting relief operations, the Marines and Sailors of the 22nd MEU combined a network of sea-based logistics and land-based support with as many as 1,100 Marines and Sailors ashore to conduct immediate aid efforts. The Marines focused on a 60-kilometer area west of Port-au-Prince, from Carrefour to Leogane, through Grand Goave to Petit Goave. In order to move and distribute supplies in these areas, Marines and Sailors partnered with the United Nations, United States Agency for International Development, non-governmental organizations, and Canadian and Spanish military forces.

Marines from the 22nd MEU assisted the World Food Program with the delivery of more than 3.2 million pounds of bulk foods, such as rice, for earthquake survivors at distribution points in and around Carrefour. According to the WFP, each bag of rice delivered can feed a family of five for two weeks – more than 55,000 families. During their relief assistance to Haiti, the Marines and Sailors conducted and assisted more than 1500 humanitarian relief missions.

The 22nd MEU independently delivered nearly 560,000 liters of bottled water and nearly 195,000 gallons of bulk water; more than 1.6 million pounds of rations and approximately 15,000 pounds of medical supplies, while rotary wing aircraft from the 22nd MEU flew more than 610 flight hours and 618 missions in direct support of Operation Unified Response to aid those affected by the earthquake.

Medical and dental personnel from the MEU worked alongside Navy Corpsmen to treat earthquake survivors and evacuated numerous Haitian citizens to USS Bataan for additional medical care.

2011-2012 Deployment, Libyan Civil War 
At the start of Operation Odyssey Dawn, the US-led operation in support of the Libyan civil war, the ground combat element of the 26th MEU was in Afghanistan conducting combat operations. In order to quickly provide sea-based ground troops to support possible ground intervention in Libya, the 22nd Marine Expeditionary Unit deployed in March 2011, 4 months prior to its originally scheduled deployment with Battalion Landing Team 2nd Battalion, 2nd Marines (2/2), Combat Logistics Battalion 22, and Marine Medium Tiltrotor Squadron 263 (VMM 263) aboard USS Bataan, USS Whidbey Island and USS Mesa Verde.  After several months preparing for possible ground combat operations and quick reaction force for Operation Odyssey Dawn, and the subsequent NATO-led Operation Unified Protector, the 22nd MEU and the Bataan Amphibious Ready Group spent a total of 10 months at sea in the Mediterranean and Middle East conducting bi-lateral training and supporting national contingency planning as a result of the new Arab Spring. Its 321-day duration fell just eight days short of the record set in 1973 by the aircraft carrier  for the longest U.S. Navy deployment since World War II. It was said to be the longest at-sea deployment in Marine unit history. The 22nd MEU was awarded the Meritorious Unit Commendation and the NATO Non-Article 5 Medal for Operation Unified Protector.

2018-2019 Deployment 
From December 2018 to July 2019, 22nd MEU deployed to the 5th and 6th Fleet areas of responsibility as part of the KEARSARGE Amphibious Ready Ground (KSG/ARG).  While deployed, 22nd MEU supported multiple operations and training exercises in the Middle East and Europe.

2020 Deployment 
From May to October 2020, 22nd MEU deployed to Moron Air Base, Spain as Special Purpose Marine Air Ground Task Force - Crisis Response - Africa (SPMAGTF-CR-AF).  While deployed, 22nd MEU supported contingency operations in North Africa.

Notable facts
22nd MEU was the first MEU to deploy with the MV-22 Osprey aircraft tilt-rotor aircraft in 2009.

In the film "Heartbreak Ridge" the 22nd MAU (Marine Amphibious Unit) was featured as the Marine Unit where Gunnery Sergeant Thomas Highway (played by Clint Eastwood) was the Recon Platoon's Non Commissioned Officer and landed in Grenada as part of the 22nd MEU operation.

Unit awards
A unit citation or commendation is an award bestowed upon an organization for the action cited. Members of the unit who participated in said actions are allowed to wear on their uniforms the awarded unit citation. The 22nd MEU has been presented with the following awards:

See also

Marine Air-Ground Task Force
List of Marine Expeditionary Units
Organization of the United States Marine Corps

Notes

References
 22nd MEU's official website

22